Theresa Weld Blanchard (August 21, 1893 – March 12, 1978) was an American figure skater who competed in the disciplines of single skating and pair skating. Her pairs partner was Nathaniel Niles.

As a singles skater, she won the gold medal at the U.S. Figure Skating Championships six times and competed three times in the Olympics, capturing a bronze medal in 1920.  With Niles, she won the national pairs title nine times and also participated in the Olympics three times.

Blanchard was also the long-time volunteer editor of the United States Figure Skating Association's official publication, Skating magazine; first jointly  with Niles from the magazine's founding in 1923, and then as sole editor after his death in 1931, until 1963.  The magazine was originally published out of her home.  Her long competitive career gave her many contacts throughout the skating world.  She also served as the first chair of the association's Professionals Committee from 1937 to 1947.

Results

Singles career

Pairs career
(with Niles)

References

Sources
 

1893 births
1978 deaths
Sportspeople from Brookline, Massachusetts
American female single skaters
American female pair skaters
Figure skaters at the 1920 Summer Olympics
Figure skaters at the 1924 Winter Olympics
Figure skaters at the 1928 Winter Olympics
Olympic bronze medalists for the United States in figure skating
Olympic medalists in figure skating
Medalists at the 1920 Summer Olympics
20th-century American women